Noose for a Lady is a 1953 British crime film directed by Wolf Rilla and starring Dennis Price, Rona Anderson and Ronald Howard. It is based on the novel Whispering Woman by Gerald Verner.

Plot

The plot concerns an amateur detective Simon Gale (Price) who races against time to clear the name of his cousin, who is accused of murdering her husband.

Gale assembles all suspects in a single room in a large house and announces that one of them is a murderer. He then explains who is the murderer and how he reached that conclusion.

Cast

Critical reception
TV Guide called the film "Overly chatty"; Cinema Retro found it "A quaint, cliché ridden drama," concluding more positively, "yes, of course it creaks a little, but if nothing else it’s guaranteed to hold your attention for its succinct 70-minute runtime"; and DVD Beaver saluted "A taut, complex whodunit with a brilliantly nerve-racking climax."

References

External links

1953 films
British crime films
1953 crime films
Films directed by Wolf Rilla
Films set in England
British black-and-white films
Films based on British novels
1950s English-language films
1950s British films